Peter Zvi Malkin (May 27, 1927 – March 1, 2005) was a Polish-born Israeli secret agent and member of the Mossad intelligence agency. He was part of the team that captured Adolf Eichmann in Argentina in 1960 and brought him to Israel to stand trial for crimes against humanity.

Early life
Peter Zvi Malchin was born on May 27, 1927 in Żółkiewka, Poland, to an observant Jewish family. In 1936, his family fled to Palestine to escape the rising tide of German anti-Semitism; his sister, Fruma, and her three children who remained behind with 150 other relatives, were murdered in the Holocaust. At the age of 12, Malkin was recruited into the Haganah as an explosives expert. He was also an expert in martial arts and disguises.

Mossad career
Malkin spent 27 years in the Mossad, first as an agent and later as Chief of Operations. As Chief of Operations he played a major role in the capture of Israel Bar, a Soviet spy who had penetrated the highest levels of Israeli government. He also led an operation against Nazi nuclear rocket scientists who assisted an Egyptian weapons development program after World War II.

Malkin's most famous mission was on May 11, 1960, when he and a team of Mossad agents led by Rafi Eitan captured Adolf Eichmann, then living and hiding in Argentina. A senior Nazi bureaucrat, Eichmann had played a key role in organizing the extermination of Jews during World War II. "Momentito, señor" (One moment, sir) were the words he uttered in Spanish as he approached Eichmann. Eichmann began to fear for his life and turned to flee, but several of Malkin's fellow agents blocked Eichmann's path. Then Malkin grabbed him in a neck-lock, wrestled him to the ground, and bundled him in the car that took them to a safe house outside Buenos Aires.

In 1989, Israeli newspaper Maariv cited him as "one of the greatest figures ever in the history of the Mossad." Israeli journalist Uri Dan called him "an extraordinary secret warrior."

Malkin is also said to have been involved in the search for Yossele Schumacher in the 1960s.

Later years
After retiring in 1976, Peter Malkin devoted his time to painting, a profession he used as a cover during his Mossad years. His paintings from the 1960s until he died have won international acclaim in London, Paris, Brussels and Israel.  He has also authored books, and served as a private international consultant on anti-terrorism methods. The movie, The Man Who Captured Eichmann (1996) starring Robert Duvall as Adolf Eichmann, was based on his book Eichmann in My Hands: also in the film was Arliss Howard, who played Malkin. More recently, Evan M. Wiener has written a play, Captors, inspired by the book. He was also portrayed by Oscar Isaac in the 2018 movie Operation Finale (with Ben Kingsley as Eichmann) and by Topol (as a character named Michael) in the 1979 film The House on Garibaldi Street. 

In the mid 1980s, Malkin was recruited to go after former SS doctor Josef Mengele. Malkin and the team of ex-Mossad agents that he put together did not know at the time that Mengele was already dead. At the last minute, Malkin and the team called off the operation when they realized that it was a trap.

Malkin spent his last years in New York City with his wife and their four children. He died on March 1, 2005.

Published works

References

External links
  Obituary: Spy who captured Eichmann
 

1927 births
2005 deaths
20th-century Polish Jews
Jewish emigrants from Nazi Germany to Mandatory Palestine
Israeli civil servants
People of the Mossad
Adolf Eichmann
Israel Defense Prize recipients